Daniel Bedinger Lucas (March 16, 1836 in Rion Hall near Charles Town, Virginia – June 24,  1909 in Charles Town, West Virginia), was a Confederate officer, poet, lawyer and ultimately justice of the West Virginia Supreme Court. He was the son of United States Senator William Lucas.

Biography
Daniel Lucas graduated from the University of Virginia and earned his law diploma from Washington College and graduated in 1856. He studied under Judge John W. Brockenbrough of Lexington and was admitted to the bar in 1859. He served with General Henry A. Wise with the Confederates during the Civil War in the Kanawha campaign of 1861. Late in the war he escaped a blockade of Virginia to aid his college friend John Yates Beall, who had been arrested as a spy. He left Richmond on January 1, 1865, and crossed the Potomac River through the ice in a small skiff. He was not allowed to assist in the defense of Beall by General John Adams Dix, and resided in Canada some months.

Beall was executed on Governor's Island in New York on February 24, 1865. Unable to return to Virginia, Lucas composed his most famous poem "The Land Where We Were Dreaming" shortly after the surrender of General Lee at Appomattox. His work often earned him the epithet "The Poet Laureate of the Lost Cause", a title he shares with several other Southern writers. When he returned to West Virginia the proscription on ex-Confederates in the practice of law prevented him from resuming his career until 1870, when restrictions were lifted. He returned to his law practice and was elected to the West Virginia Legislature from 1884 to 1887.

In 1887, he strongly opposed Johnson N. Camden, whom he considered an ally of Standard Oil. This led Governor Emanuel Willis Wilson to appoint Daniel Lucas to the United States Senate. The legislature, however, decided instead to select Charles J. Faulkner. Governor Wilson appointed Lucas to the Supreme Court of Appeals on December 11, 1889. Lucas also served as President of the Court during his service.

Poetry 
"The Land Where We Were Dreaming" was first published in the Montreal Gazette and was reprinted widely in the United States and England. It was dated "Chambly, June 1865".

In 1869, he published a collection called The Wreath of Eglantine. The book's first part contains poetry by his sister, Virginia Bedinger Lucas, who had died young (she was born in 1838 and died at age 27) but had published some poems in various Southern journals under the pen name "Eglantine"; this first section is called "The Wreath of Eglantine". The second part of the volume is his own work, in three sections: "Patriotic and National Poems" (poetry inspired by the Lost Cause), "Tintographic Melodies" (lyrical and meditative poems, including an elegy on his sister), and "Saint Agnes of Guienne" (a long poem based on the life of Agnes of Poitou). His poems from that book, and his published and unpublished poetry, were edited and republished by Charles W. Kent, then of the University of Virginia, in 1913.

His work on this theme resulted in frequent requests for memorial poems for dedications, such as the consecration of the Stonewall Cemetery in Winchester, Virginia in 1866, and the dedication of the Confederate Monument in Charlestown, West Virginia in 1871. Further works included such poems as Jackson's Grave and A.P.Hill.

 The Wreath of Eglantine, and Other Poems (Baltimore: Kelly, Piet & Company, 1869)
 The Maid of Northumberland: A Dramatic Poem (New York: G.P. Putman's Sons, 1879)
 Ballads and Madrigals (New York: Pollard & Moss, 1884)
 The Land Where We Were Dreaming (Boston: Roger G. Badger/Gorham Press, 1913)

Prose 
 Memoir of John Yates Beall: His Life; Trial; Correspondence; Diary; and Private Manuscript Found among His Papers, including his own account of the raid on Lake Erie (Montreal: J. Lovell, 1865)
 Nicaragua: War of the Filibusters (Richmond: B. F. Johnson Publishing Co., 1896)

References

1836 births
1909 deaths
19th-century American lawyers
19th-century American male writers
19th-century American poets
20th-century American lawyers
American male poets
Bedinger family
Burials at Zion Episcopal Churchyard (Charles Town, West Virginia)
Confederate States Army soldiers
Episcopalians from Virginia
Episcopalians from West Virginia
Justices of the Supreme Court of Appeals of West Virginia
Members of the West Virginia House of Delegates
Military personnel from West Virginia
People from Charles Town, West Virginia
People of Virginia in the American Civil War
People of West Virginia in the American Civil War
Poets from Virginia
Poets from West Virginia
Poets of the Confederacy
Robert Lucas family
University of Virginia alumni
Virginia Democrats
Virginia lawyers
Washington and Lee University School of Law alumni
West Virginia Democrats
West Virginia lawyers